Jerry Dixon is an American actor, director, lyricist, choreographer, and composer best known for his work on the Broadway stage.

Personal life
Dixon was born in Chicago. He married Mario Cantone in 2011 after initially meeting in 1991. Dixon collaborated with Cantone as part of the creative team for Cantone's one-man shows An Evening With Mario Cantone and Laugh Whore.

In 2017, Dixon was named Artistic Director of the Village Theatre in Seattle.

Broadway Credits

Acting
Once on This Island, Daniel Beauxhomme, Oct. 18, 1990 - Dec. 1, 1991
Once on This Island, Daniel Beauxhomme, 2002, reunion concert
Five Guys Named Moe, Nomax, Apr. 8, 1992 - May 2, 1993
If/Then, Stephen, Mar. 30, 2014 - Mar. 22, 2015

Other
An Evening With Mario Cantone, Music/Lyrics/Musical supervisor, 2002
Laugh Whore, Music/Lyrics/Musical supervisor/Music arrangements/Assistant Director, 2004
Rock of Ages, Music/Lyrics, 2009

Regional Theatre
Crowns
Two Gentlemen of Verona, director
The Full Monty as director/choreographer
Take Me America as director
Show Boat director, at the Village Theatre
Bernarda Alba, director
Barnstomer at the Red Mountain Theatre Company
Ain't Misbehavin
The Thing About Time, director, NYC workshop
Reunion in Bartersville, director, NYC workshop
Great Wall, director, Village Theatre
Buddy's Tavern
Dig Lenny Bruce
21
Ragtime (musical), Coalhouse
Dreamgirls, Curtis
Funked Up Fairy Tales, director/choreographer

off-Broadway Credits
The River, 1988, Acolytes/Man #1 (u/s)/Man #2 (u/s)
Once on This Island, Daniel Beauxhomme, 1990
Bright Lights, Big City, Tad, 1999
Taking a Chance on Love, Performer, 2000
The Bubbly Black Girl Sheds Her Chameleon Skin, Lucas, 2000 (also jazz teacher and dance captain)
Tick, Tick... Boom!, Michael, 2001
Newyorkers, Performer, 2001
Romantic Poetry, Frankie, 2008
Steve, 2015

Film and Television Credits

TV
Beverly Hills, 90210, Beach Club Director, 1 episode, 1996
Seinfeld, Customer, 1 episode, 1997
Law & Order, Detective Alvin Roberts, 1 episode, 2004
Everwood, Piano Player, 1 episode, 2005
Mario Cantone: Laugh Whore, TV movie, 2005 (composer)
The Broadway.com Show, Jerry Dixon, 3 episodes, 2014
He's With Me, Lyle Pressman, 2 episode, 2015
Gotham, Mr. Thatch, 1 episode, 2016

Film
The Peacemaker, Sniper #2, 1997

Other Work
Dixon also teaches classes in workshopping shows, auditioning, and adapting stories. In concert form, Dixon has performed and worked with such performers as Idina Menzel, Julia Murney, Norm Lewis, LaChanze, Marin Mazzie, and Raul Midon.

Awards and nominations
2002 Drama Desk Award for Outstanding Featured Actor in a Musical for tick...tick...BOOM! (nominated)

References

 http://www.playbillvault.com/Person/Detail/1097/Jerry-Dixon
http://www.jerrydixon.com/#!about/c10fk
http://www.jerrydixon.com/#!theatre/c234g
http://www.jerrydixon.com/#!video/c1knb
http://www.jerrydixon.com/#!concert/c15qv
http://www.jerrydixon.com/#!current/c1j2j
http://www.jerrydixon.com/#!services/c15ya

External links
 Jerry Dixon on IMDb

American male stage actors
Living people
1961 births